Gil Khuran District is a district (bakhsh) in Juybar County, Mazandaran Province, Iran. At the 2006 census, its population was 20,875, in 5,362 families.  The District has one city: Kuhi Kheyl. The District has two rural districts (dehestan): Chapakrud Rural District and Larim Rural District.

References 

Juybar County
Districts of Mazandaran Province